The 2005 Gerry Weber Open was a men's tennis tournament played on outdoor grass courts. It was the 13th edition of the Gerry Weber Open, and was part of the International Series of the 2005 ATP Tour. It took place at the Gerry Weber Stadion in Halle, North Rhine-Westphalia, Germany, from 6 June through 12 June 2005. First-seeded Roger Federer win the singles title.

Finals

Singles

 Roger Federer defeated  Marat Safin, 6–4, 6–7(6–8), 6–4
It was Federer's 7th title of the year, and the 29th of his career. It was his 3rd consecutive win at the event.

Doubles

 Yves Allegro /  Roger Federer defeated  Joachim Johansson /  Marat Safin, 7–5, 6–7(6–8), 6–3
It was Allegro's 2nd title of the year and the 3rd of his career. It was Federer's 8th title of the year and the 30th of his career.

References

External links
 Official website 
 ITF tournament edition details

 
Gerry Weber Open
Halle Open
2005 in German tennis